Renato William Beghe (March 12, 1933 – July 7, 2012) was a judge of the United States Tax Court appointed by President George H. W. Bush.

Beghe was born in Illinois, the son of Emmavve (née Frymire) and Bruno Beghe, an Italian-born painter, sculptor, and violinist. Beghe received his bachelor's degree from the University of Chicago in 1951 and his J.D. from the University of Chicago in 1954.  While a student, he joined  Phi Beta Kappa, Order of the Coif and Phi Gamma Delta.  Beghe was the co-managing editor of the law review. He was admitted to the New York Bar in 1955 and practiced law with the New York City firm of Carter Ledyard & Milburn until 1983.  He practiced with the New York City firm of Morgan, Lewis & Bockius until 1989.   President George H. W. Bush appointed him as a Judge on the United States Tax Court on March 26, 1991, for a term ending March 25, 2006.  Beghe retired on February 28, 2003, but continued to perform judicial duties as a senior judge on recall.  Beghe died on July 7, 2012, after a long illness.

Beghe was a member of numerous professional organizations, including the American Bar Association, Tax Section; the International Bar Association; Business Section Committee N (Taxation); Judge's Forum; Human Rights Institute; International Fiscal Association; American Law Institute, American College of Tax Counsel; and the Honorable Order of Kentucky Colonels.

His son is actor Jason Beghe.

References

External links
 Renato Beghe's page at USTaxCourt.gov

1933 births
Judges of the United States Tax Court
United States Article I federal judges appointed by George H. W. Bush
2012 deaths
University of Chicago alumni
University of Chicago Law School alumni